Trachelophora maculosa is a species of beetle in the family Cerambycidae. It was described by Per Olof Christopher Aurivillius in 1923. It is known to be found in Borneo.

References

Homonoeini
Beetles described in 1923